The 2021 South and Central American Men's Club Handball Championship the 2nd edition of this tournament was held in Taubaté, Brazil from 24 to 27 August 2021. It acted as a qualifying tournament for the 2021 IHF Men's Super Globe.

Participating teams
 Handebol Taubaté
 EC Pinheiros
 Nacional Handebol Clube
 Club Olimpia

Results

All times are local (UTC–3).

References

South and Central American Men's Club Handball Championship
South and Central American Men's Club Handball Championship
S
South and Central American Men's Club Handball Championship
South and Central American Men's Club Handball Championship